Tetracha brasiliensis is a species of tiger beetle that was described by William Kirby in 1818, and can be found in every country of South America except for Bolivia, Chile, Ecuador, Suriname, and Uruguay.

References

Cicindelidae
Beetles of South America
Beetles described in 1818
Taxa named by William Kirby (entomologist)